Nuragheite is a rare natural thorium molybdate, formula Th(MoO4)2·H2O, discovered in Su Seinargiu, Sarroch, Cagliari, Sardegna, Italy. This locality is also a place of discovery of the other thorium molybdate - ichnusaite, which is a trihydrate.

Occurrence and association
Nuragheite is a part of molybdenum-bismuth mineralization. It coexists with ichnusaite, muscovite, and xenotime-(Y).

Notes on chemistry
Nuragheite is chemically pure.

Crystal structure
The crystal structure of nuragheite is composed of (100) layers with IXTh-centered polyhedra and Mo-centered tetrahedra. It is thus similar to that of ichnusaite.

References

Thorium minerals
Molybdate minerals
Monoclinic minerals
Minerals in space group 14